The 1981 Brazilian Grand Prix was the second race of the 1981 Formula One World Championship and was held on 29 March 1981 at Jacarepaguá in Rio de Janeiro, Brazil. Formula One moved to the Jacarepaguá circuit in Rio de Janeiro from the Interlagos circuit in São Paulo, after safety concerns with the long Interlagos circuit and the growing slums of São Paulo being at odds with the glamorous image of Formula One.

The Argentine driver Carlos Reutemann won the race in contentious circumstances; he ignored his pit signals to give up the lead to his teammate and team leader Alan Jones. Jones, who finished in 2nd, did not show up on the podium afterwards.

Classification

Qualifying

Race 

Colombian driver Ricardo Londoño was denied a superlicense, was not allowed to participate in official practice, and unable to race.

Championship standings after the race 

Drivers' Championship standings

Constructors' Championship standings

Note: Only the top five positions are included for both sets of standings.

References

Further reading
 

Brazilian Grand Prix
Brazilian Grand Prix
Grand Prix
Brazilian Grand Prix